The Elms is a historic mansion in Natchez, Adams County, Mississippi.

Location
It is located at 801 Washington Street in Natchez, Mississippi

History
The mansion was built in 1804. It contained two ground floor rooms, two second floor rooms, a two-room attic, and one chimney. A decade later, in 1815, it was extended with a new two-story wing, a formal parlor on the first floor and a master bedroom on the second floor.

From 1825 to 1835, it served as the Presbyterian manse. In the early 1840s, it was used as a young ladies’ boarding school. In 1859, it belonged to Mrs and Mr Thomas Thornhill.

Shortly after the American Civil War of 1861–1865, Mosely (John Posey) Drake (1817–1899) and Caroline (Love America) Drake (1823–1901) purchased the mansion. It remains in their family. The present owner is Esther Carpenter, an artist and a chef.

It has been listed on the National Register of Historic Places since November 7, 1976. It is used as a Bed & Breakfast.

References

Houses on the National Register of Historic Places in Mississippi
Houses in Natchez, Mississippi
Houses completed in 1804
National Register of Historic Places in Natchez, Mississippi
Individually listed contributing properties to historic districts on the National Register in Mississippi